Okato Number Kurraadu is a 2002 Indian Telugu-language romantic drama film directed by A. Kodandarami Reddy and starring newcomer Taraka Ratna and Rekha.

Cast 

Taraka Ratna as Balu
Rekha as Swapna
Tanikella Bharani as Swapna's father
Rajeev Kanakala as Rajeev
Devadas Kanakala as Rajeev's father
Giribabu as Swapna's uncle
Chitram Seenu
MS Narayana
Dharmavarapu Subramanyam
Sunil
Chitti Babu
Raghu Babu

Production
This was the second film Taraka Ratna shot for but ended up releasing first. The film was initially titled 1va Number Kurraadu.

Soundtrack 
Music by M. M. Keeravani. Lyrics by Chandrabose and Suddala Ashok Teja.
"Thodakotti Chebutunna" - S. P. Balasubrahmanyam, Godwin
"Nuvvu Choodu Choodakapo" - M. M. Keeravani, Ganga
"Orey Nuvvu" - S. P. B. Charan, K. S. Chitra
"Aggipulla" - Tippu,  Kalpana
"Nemali Kannoda" - Udit Narayan, K. S. Chitra
"Enni Janmalettinaa - S. P. Balasubrahmanyam, K. S. Chitra

Reception 
Gudipoodi Srihari of The Hindu opined that "He [Taraka Ratna] impresses with acting, dancing and fighting, the essential ingredients of modern cinema. But the theme is ordinary, narrating a routine story" and called M. M. Keeravani's music "a redeeming factor". Jeevi of Idlebrain.com wrote that "The film starts with an interesting incident [...] But the scenes shown in between are not good enough make viewers excited". A critic from Full Hyderabad opined that "As a movie, Okato Number Kurraadu sucks. That's because it has nothing new by way of a script, remorselessly follows an earlier movie by the same filmmakers".

References

2002 films